Amata marinoides is a moth of the family Erebidae. It was described by Sergius G. Kiriakoff in 1954. It is found in the Democratic Republic of the Congo and Kenya.

References

 

marinoides
Moths described in 1954
Moths of Africa